John Bayly may refer to:

 John Bayly (priest, died 1633), guardian of Christ's Hospital, Ruthin, and chaplain to Charles I
 John Bayly (priest, died 1831), Dean of Lismore
 John Percy Bayly (1882–1963), Fijian businessman, politician and philanthropist

See also
 John Bayley (disambiguation)
 John Bailey (disambiguation)
 John Baily (disambiguation)